It was a Dacian fortified town.

References

Dacian fortresses in Olt County
Historic monuments in Olt County